Rabaud may refer to:
Henri Rabaud (1873-1949), French composer
ribauldequin, a medieval volley gun